Bhagyajathakam is an Indian Malayalam-language soap opera launched on 23 July 2018 on Mazhavil Manorama. Shafna Nizam played the female protagonist of the series.

Plot 
Indulekha, a 22-year-old poor girl survives by selling milk to the neighborhood on a daily basis. Born to Parvathy Shenoy, the sole daughter of the affluent Shenoy family, she was abandoned by her relatives at birth who makes Parvathy believe that her child is dead. She was then adopted by another family.

The engagement of the sole son of the same family's current head Vishwanath Shenoy (Indulekha's maternal uncle) was cancelled due to issues with horoscope. According to the astrologer who examined Vishwanath Shenoy's son, Arun's horoscope, the very first bride will die miserably within six months of the marriage. The shrewd Shenoy then decided to search for a financially poor girl for their son after temporarily holding the marriage with the rich girl.

Indulekha was chosen by Shenoy for the purpose and entered the Shenoy family as the daughter-in-law. Without knowing that it was her own mother who was enslaved by the elder Shenoy, she started her new chapter of life in the same house with her actual mother. Nothing happened Indulekha even after six months. Shenoy worried and summoned the same astrologer who realized that prediction went wrong due to incorrect birth time given. The astrologer also realized that Indulekha's horoscope is a lucky one and this further frustrates Shenoy. He now wanted to eliminate Indulekha at any cost. Indulekha becomes pregnant. Parvathy decides to write all her assets in Indulekha's name.

Vishwanath Shenoy now introduces Neeraja whom he claims is the daughter of his sister Parvathy. Arun, influenced by his ex-girlfriend Abhirami and Neeraja, tries to kill Indulekha's baby; but later learns the truth and starts loving Indulekha. Meanwhile, Indulekha is told her birth secrets by her stepfather but vows to keep it silent and not to disclose it to Parvathy until she learns Neeraja's intention.

Cast

Main 
 Shafna Nizam as Indulekha
 Gireesh Nambiar / Sidharth Venugopal as Arun Shenoy

Recurring 
 Manve Surendran / Karoline / Lekshmi Pramod as Abhirami
 Sindhu Varma as Parvathy Shenoy
 Balachandran Chullikadu / Mahesh as Vishwanath Shenoy
 Kishore / Manoj Pillai as Sukumaran
 Archana Menon / Soniya Baiju Kottarakkara as Subhadra Shenoy
 Fawaz Zayani as Reghuraman
 Vishnu V Nair as Ananthan
 Sumi Santhosh / Sindhu Jacob / Usha as Sumathi
 Vishnu Prakash as Prabhakara Kurup
 Bindu Ramakrishnan as Subhashini Amma
 K.P.A.C Leelamani as Rosamma
 Arathy Sojan as Madhuri
 Yamuna Mahesh as Radhika
 Vipin James as Vikraman
 Nithu Thomas as Lakshmi
 Payyannur Murali as Raghu's father
 Shreya Raj Nair as Neeraja
 Karthika Kannan as Janaki
 Neena Kurup as Vasanthi
 Kottayam Rasheed as Kanakambhuran
 Faizal Razi
 Blessy Kurien as Reshma
 Ambili Sunil
 Adhithyan Jayan as Tomichan

References

External links 
 Official website
 

2018 Indian television series debuts
Malayalam-language television shows
Mazhavil Manorama original programming